Martin Kukučín is a sculpture of the Slovak writer of the same name by Ivan Meštrović. Copies exist in Bratislava, Slovakia and on the Oregon State University campus in Corvallis, Oregon, in the United States. The statue depicts Kukučín seated with his legs crossed, wearing a suit and boots. He holds an open book in his hands, on his lap.

Bratislava, Slovakia 
The statue in Bratislava is in the Medic Garden (Medická záhrada) in Old Town, near the Ondrejský Cemetery. 

Oregon State University
The bronze statue on the Oregon State University campus in Corvallis, Oregon, dated 1977, is installed on the west side of The Valley Library. The installation includes a plaque with the inscription, . The work was surveyed and deemed "treatment needed" by Smithsonian Institution's "Save Outdoor Sculpture!"program in April 1993.

See also
 1977 in art

References

1977 establishments in Oregon
1977 sculptures
Books in art
Bronze sculptures in Oregon
Monuments and memorials in Corvallis, Oregon
Monuments and memorials in Slovakia
Oregon State University campus
Outdoor sculptures in Corvallis, Oregon
Outdoor sculptures in Slovakia
Sculptures by Ivan Meštrović
Sculptures of men in Oregon
Sculptures of men in Slovakia
Statues in Oregon
Statues in Slovakia
Works by Croatian people